Vinc may refer to:

Matt Vinc (born 1982), Canadian lacrosse player

See also
Vinț River, a river in Romania